Samuel R. Russell (born 2 January 1900, died 8 November 1959) was an Irish footballer. He was born in Downpatrick, Ireland. During his career he had spells with Derry City, Newcastle United and Bradford City. He also represented the Ireland national team on three occasions between 1929 and 1931.

Personal life 
Russell served in the Royal Irish Fusiliers during the First World War. He was married but he and his wife Margaret had no children.

References

External links
 
 

1900 births
Association footballers from Northern Ireland
Newcastle United F.C. players
Bradford City A.F.C. players
People from Downpatrick
Year of death missing
League of Ireland XI players
Shelbourne F.C. players
Pre-1950 IFA international footballers
Derry City F.C. players
Lisburn Distillery F.C. players
Association football defenders
British Army personnel of World War I
Royal Irish Fusiliers soldiers